Francis–Gulick Mill is a historic archaeological site located near Leesburg, Loudoun County, Virginia. The site includes a small stone miller's house foundation, stone remnants of a mill foundation, and the millrace and two millstones that are lying next to the miller's house foundations. The mill and miller's house may have been built as early as the late-18th century and were in use at least by the second decade of the 19th century. The mill appears to have been abandoned by 1879 and the house was abandoned in the 1880s.

It was listed on the National Register of Historic Places in 2006.

References

Archaeological sites on the National Register of Historic Places in Virginia
National Register of Historic Places in Loudoun County, Virginia
Leesburg, Virginia